A medical dictionary is a lexicon for words used in medicine. The three major  medical dictionaries in the United States are Stedman's, Taber's, and Dorland's. Other significant medical dictionaries are distributed by Elsevier. Dictionaries often have multiple versions, with  content adapted for different user groups. For example Stedman's Concise Medical Dictionary and Dorland's are for general use and allied health care, while the full text editions are reference works used by medical students, doctors, and health professionals. Medical dictionaries are commonly available in print, online, or as downloadable software packages for personal computers and smartphones.

History 

The earliest known glossaries of medical terms were discovered on Egyptian papyrus authored around 1600 B.C. Other precursors to modern medical dictionaries include lists of terms compiled from the Hippocratic Corpus in the first century AD.

The Synonyma Simonis Genuensis (the Synonyms of Simon of Genoa), attributed to the physician to Pope Nicholas IV in the year 1288, was printed by Antonius Zarotus at Milan in 1473. Referring to a copy held in the library
of the College of Physicians of Philadelphia, Henry wrote in 1905 that "It is the first edition of the first medical dictionary." However, this claim is disputed as the composition only included lists of herbs and drugs. By the time of Antonio Guaineri (died in 1440) and Savonarola, this work was used alongside others by Oribasius, Isidore of Seville, Mondino dei Liuzzi, Serapion, and Pietro d'Abano. Then, as now, writers struggled with the terminology used in various translations from earlier Greek, Latin, Hebrew, and Arabic works. Later works by Jacques Desparts and Jacopo Berengario da Carpi continued building on the Synonyma.

Definitions
In medical dictionaries, definitions should to the greatest extent possible be:
Simple and easy to understand, preferably even by the general public
Useful clinically or in related areas where the definition will be used.
Specific, that is, by reading the definition only, it should ideally not be possible to refer to any other entity than the one being defined. 
Measurable
Reflecting current scientific knowledge

See also
Acronyms in healthcare 
Medical classification
Medical terminology

References

External links
 Directory of Medical Dictionaries on Curlie
 Directory of Medical Dictionaries on OpenMD
 Merriam-Webster Medical Dictionary
 TheFreeDictionary: Medical Dictionary
 Android Medical Dictionaries on Google Play
 iOS Medical Dictionaries on Apple App Store

 
Dictionaries by type